Vehicle registration began in the Isle of Man on 1 January 1906, following the Highways Act Amendment Act 1905.

History
Initially, number plates started with the letters 'MN' followed by up to four digits. In March 1935, the prefix 'MAN' came into use, followed by up to three digits, and in April 1936 a further three-letter scheme was introduced, placing a serial letter before the 'MN' code (giving the range  to ).

In November 1971, unissued numbers from the original  to  range started to be issued.

The initial plate in this system was therefore , with the registration  being issued following . Thus the trailing letter does not indicate the vehicle age, unlike the similar format British plates, and many different suffix letters are issued each year.

Format
The letters I, Q, S and Z are not used on Manx number plates. Additionally the letter A is also not used as the initial letter and the letter O is not used as the final letter.

The Isle of Man uses retro-reflective number plates with black letters; on a white background on the front of the vehicle, and yellow on the rear. Vehicles manufactured prior to 1 February 1990 can display white-on-black plates as an alternative.

Since 23 April 2004 plates may incorporate the Manx flag, bearing the triskelion symbol surrounded by a circle of six stars, representing the 6 sheadings and the international country identification code GBM (Great Britain and Northern Ireland – (Isle of) Man).

The region code 'MN' was reserved for the Isle of Man in the original Great Britain 1903 numbering scheme, and the code 'MAN' in the 1932 GB scheme. This means that no Isle of Man registration is duplicated by a GB registration. When the current 2001 scheme was adopted in Great Britain, the region code 'MN' (within the 'M' range for Manchester) was reserved as well as other combinations of MN.

MN is also the format for registration plates of County Monaghan (MN) Ireland so a vehicle featuring these plates eg 171-MN-234 could possibly be seen on the island but bears no connection to the island's registration system.

The current valid list of number plate formats are:

There are around 65,000 registered vehicles in the Isle of Man. Number plates are produced and supplied privately, not by the government. The name of the supplying car dealer is often displayed along the bottom of the plate. Registrations can be transferred from vehicle to vehicle.

The official car of the Lieutenant Governor carries the registration number . Registrations including the numbers 999 or 112 (for example) are used for emergency vehicles, but not exclusively.

References

External links
 

Transport in the Isle of Man
Isle of Man